Major General Sir John Eardley Wilmot Inglis  (15 November 1814 – 27 September 1862) was a British Army officer, best known for his role in protecting the British compound for 87 days in the siege of Lucknow.

Military career
In 1833 he joined the 32nd (Cornwall) Regiment of Foot, in which all his regimental service was passed. In 1837 he saw active service in Canada in the Lower Canada Rebellion, including the actions at St. Denis and St. Eustache.

During the Second Anglo-Sikh War, in 1848 to 1849 in the Punjab, He was in command at the Siege of Multan and at the Battle of Gujrat.

In 1857, on the outbreak of the Indian Mutiny, he was in command of his regiment at Lucknow. Sir Henry Lawrence being mortally wounded during the siege of the residency, Inglis took command of the garrison, and maintained a successful defence for 87 days against an overwhelming force. He was promoted to major-general and made K.C.B.

After further active service in India, he was, in 1860, given command of the British troops in the Ionian Islands. In 1860 he was given the colonelcy of his regiment, now the 32nd (Cornwall) Regiment of Foot (Light Infantry), a position he held until his death.

He died at Homburg on 27 September 1862, aged 47 and was buried in the crypt of Saint Paul's Cathedral, London.

Family

He was born in Nova Scotia, the son of John Inglis, the third bishop of that colony and grandson of Charles Inglis (bishop).

He was married to Julia Selina Thesiger (1833–1904), daughter of Frederic Thesiger who wrote of her experiences during the siege of Lucknow including extracts from her diary.

Their children included Rupert Edward Inglis who was an England rugby international, who was killed at the Battle of the Somme in 1916. His letters home to his wife from the front were published by his widow after the war.

Legacy
Inglis is the namesake of Inglis Street, Halifax, Nova Scotia, which connects with Lucknow Street

Gallery

See also
Military history of Nova Scotia

References

External links

India and its mutiny: a lecture delivered before the Halifax Young Men's Christian Association, on Tuesday evening, March 16, 1858

1814 births
1862 deaths
Burials at St Paul's Cathedral
People from Nova Scotia
British Army major generals
32nd Regiment of Foot officers
19th-century British people
British military personnel of the Second Anglo-Sikh War
British military personnel of the Indian Rebellion of 1857
University of King's College alumni
Knights Commander of the Order of the Bath
Military history of Nova Scotia
Inglis family